The Dunnellon Boomtown Historic District is a U.S. historic district (designated as such on December 8, 1988) located in Dunnellon, Florida. The district is bounded by McKinney Avenue, Illinois Street, Pennsylvania Avenue, and Cedar Street. It contains 70 historic buildings.

References

External links
 Marion County listings at National Register of Historic Places

National Register of Historic Places in Marion County, Florida
Historic districts on the National Register of Historic Places in Florida